Gilbert McKechnie (1845 – December 21, 1930) was a Scottish-born Ontario merchant and political figure. He represented Grey South in the Legislative Assembly of Ontario from 1891 to 1894 as a Liberal member.

He was born in Campbeltown, Argyleshire in 1845 and came to Canada West in 1855.

He owned a general store and was also president of the G. B. & W. Railway. McKechnie represented Durham Township on the council for Grey County from 1877 to 1884 and in 1887. He was elected to the provincial assembly in an 1891 by-election held after the death of James Hill Hunter. McKechnie was unsuccessful in a bid for reelection in 1894.

He died on December 21, 1930.

References

External links
The Canadian parliamentary companion, 1891 JA Gemmill

A History of the county of Grey, EL Marsh (1931)

1845 births
1930 deaths
Ontario Liberal Party MPPs
People from Campbeltown
People from Grey County
Scottish emigrants to Canada